Mullu Q'awa (Aymara mullu colored stone like a coral with which they make necklaces,  q'awa little river, ditch, crevice, fissure, gap in the earth, hispanicized spellings Molloqhawa, Muyuqhawa) is an archaeological site in Peru on a mountain of that name. It is located in the Cusco Region, Espinar Province, Alto Pichigua District. It lies near the village of Mullu Q'awa (Molloccahua, Molloqhawa).

The site was declared a National Cultural Heritage (Patrimonio Cultural) by Resolution No. 954-2010- INC on April 27, 2010.

References 

Archaeological sites in Peru
Archaeological sites in Cusco Region
Mountains of Peru
Mountains of Cusco Region